Villa Literno is a comune (municipality) in the Province of Caserta in the Italian region Campania, located about  northwest of Naples and about  west of Caserta.

Villa Literno borders the following municipalities: Cancello e Arnone, Casal di Principe, Castel Volturno, Giugliano in Campania, San Cipriano d'Aversa.

References

Cities and towns in Campania